Hendrika Anna Maria "Ria" van der Horst (born 10 August 1932) is a former Dutch backstroke swimmer who participated in the 1948 and 1952 Summer Olympics. In 1948, she was fifth in 100 m backstroke, and in 1952 she was disqualified for an incorrect turn. She won the gold medal in the same event at the 1950 European Aquatics Championships.

References

1932 births
Living people
Dutch female backstroke swimmers
Olympic swimmers of the Netherlands
Swimmers at the 1948 Summer Olympics
Swimmers at the 1952 Summer Olympics
Swimmers from Rotterdam
European Aquatics Championships medalists in swimming
20th-century Dutch women